Mariam of Georgia may refer to:
Mariam of Vaspurakan (fl. 11th century), wife of George I of Georgia
Maria of Alania (1050–1118), daughter of Bagrat IV of Georgia
Mariam Tsitsishvili (1768–1850), wife of George XII of Georgia
Mariam, daughter of Heraclius II of Georgia (1755–1828)
Mariam, daughter of Bagrat IV of Georgia